Shirvanshah Ali was fourth independent Shah of Shirvan, located in the modern day Azerbaijan Republic, after the death of his father Haytham II Shirvanshah. He fought along local feudals against Khazars around the Gates of Alexander. He also struggled against Rus' raids.

References